IJIR: Your Sexual Medicine Journal is a bimonthly peer-reviewed medical journal covering the study of sexual dysfunction. It was established in 1989 and is published by Springer Nature. The editor-in-chief is Ege can Serefoglu. According to the Journal Citation Reports, the journal has a 2020 impact factor of 2.896, ranking it 43rd out of 90 journals in the category "Urology and Nephrology".

References

External links

Sexology journals
Urology journals
Publications established in 1989
Nature Research academic journals
Bimonthly journals
English-language journals